Stictomyia is a genus of picture-winged flies in the family Ulidiidae.

Species
Stictomyia longicornis Bigot, 1885
Stictomyia punctata Coquillett, 1900

References

Ulidiidae
Taxa named by Jacques-Marie-Frangile Bigot
Diptera of North America
Brachycera genera